Podlom is a small settlement in the Municipality of Kamnik in the Upper Carniola region of Slovenia.
It lies in the Kamnik Alps, just under the Črnivec Pass.

References

External links

Podlom on Geopedia

Populated places in the Municipality of Kamnik